Huaycama is a village and municipality within the Valle Viejo Department of Catamarca Province in northwestern Argentina.

References

Populated places in Catamarca Province